Azumi is a Japanese comic and media franchise.

Azumi may also refer to:
 Azumi (name)
 Azumi people, a people of ancient Japan
 Azumi, Nagano, a former village in Minamiazumi District, Nagano Prefecture, Japan, that was merged into Matsumoto in 2005
 Azumi (film), a film based on the manga

See also
 Azumi-Kutsukake Station, a railway stop on the Oito Line in Japan
 Azumi-Oiwake Station, a railway stop on the Oito Line in Japan